The Pioneer Award is selected by the Professional Group on Aeronautical and Navigational Electronics and has been given out annually since 1949. The Pioneer Award is awarded to an individual or team for significant contributions of interest to the IEEE Aerospace and Electronic Systems Society. To ensure proper historical perspective, the award is given for contributions that have been made at least twenty years prior to the award year.

Recipients

(P) denotes posthumous award.

See also
 List of engineering awards

References

External links
Pioneer Award Committee of the IEEE Aerospace and Electronic Systems Society

IEEE awards
Aerospace engineering awards